Gustav Muss-Arnolt (1858 - February 9, 1927) was a painter who specialized in animal portraits. He painted waterfowl, dogs and horses. He was a director of the American Kennel Club.

Biography
He was born in Germany in 1858. Around 1890 he migrated to the United States and lived in New York City.

He moved to Tuckahoe, New York. He died on February 9, 1927.

References

19th-century German painters
19th-century German male artists
German male painters
German emigrants to the United States
1858 births
1927 deaths
20th-century German painters
20th-century German male artists